Hockley railway station may refer to:

Hockley railway station (Essex)
Hockley railway station (West Midlands), which closed in 1972